Awesome Con is an annual pop culture convention in Washington, D.C. The event takes place in the Walter E. Washington Convention Center.

Awesome Con debuted in 2013 and become one of the largest fan conventions on the East Coast of the United States. The 2013 event drew about 7,000 attendees. The 2022 event hosted 50,000 attendees. Celebrity guests have included David Tennant, John Boyega, Stan Lee, Alex Kingston, William Shatner, George Takei, and many others.

Highlights 

Civil rights icon and Congressman John Lewis attended Awesome Con in 2014. He spoke at a panel about his autobiographical graphic novel "March", which covers his childhood and civil rights activity.

History of Awesome Con

The 2020 convention was cancelled due to the COVID-19 pandemic. The event was originally scheduled for Spring 2020 and was rescheduled for December 2020, but was eventually called off completely. Awesome Con returned in August of 2021 with guests Michael J. Fox, Christopher Lloyd, Billy Boyd, Christina Ricci, George Takei, Adam Savage, William Shatner, Amy Chu, Sam Maggs, and Ron Marz.

References

Conventions in Washington, D.C.
Annual events in Washington, D.C.
2013 establishments in Washington, D.C.
Comics conventions in the United States
Science fiction conventions in the United States